The Laki dwarf gecko (Microgecko laki) is a species of lizard in the family Gekkonidae. It is endemic to Iran.

References

Microgecko
Reptiles described in 2020
Reptiles of Iran